Denmark (foaled 1839) was a major foundation sire of the American Saddlebred horse breed. Over 60% of all the horses in the first three volumes of the Saddlebred studbook trace back to him. Denmark sired the stallion Gaines' Denmark, an influential sire of the breed.

Life
Denmark was a brown stallion foaled in Kentucky in 1839, sired by an imported Thoroughbred named Hedgeford. He sired the stallion Gaines' Denmark, who became an influential sire. Denmark was used as a cavalry horse in the American Civil War.

Influence
When the National Saddle Horse Breeders' Association, precursor to the American Saddlebred Horse Association, was founded in 1891, Denmark was named as one of 17 foundation sires. Sixty percent of the horses in the first three volumes of the registry traced to him. In 1908, the directors of the National Saddle Horse Breeders' Association voted to make Denmark the sole foundation sire,
although Harrison Chief was included as an additional foundation sire for the breed in 1991. For over 150 years, the Denmark bloodline was the best-known within the Saddlebred breed and Saddlebreds were sometimes referred to as "Denmarks".

Sire line tree

Denmark
John Willard
Miller's Denmark
William's Denmark
Grey Denmark
Muir's Denmark
Rob Roy
Gaines' Denmark
Ashland Denmark
Billie Cromwell
Denmark Jr
Black Prince
Bronough's Denmark
Champion Denmark
Garnett's Denmark
Kentucky Prince
Kentucky Prince Jr
Old Nigger Baby
Donovan's Diamond
Lee Woolfolk
Pilot Denmark
Arabian Denmark
Star Denmark
Tuckahoe
Young Tuckahoe
Wilson Rose's Denmark
Harris Denmark
Lewis Arlington Denmark
Field's Denmark
Washington Denmark
Captain
Conley's Forrest Denmark
Kendal's Denmark
Duryea's Denmark
Pacolet Denmark
Premium Jewel
King Raven
Prince Denmark Jr
Vandal Denmark
Robinson's Denmark of Kentucky
Son of Washington Denmark
Warren Harris Denmark
Washington Denmark Jr
Ewing's Denmark
King William
Billy Denmark
Black William
Bonnie Laddie
Clark's Bourbon Denmark
Hile's King William
Horace Greeley
Sam Denmark
Wilson's Denmark
Black Eagle
Artist
King William II
Cromwell
Bond's Denmark Chief
Bourbon Denmark
Denmark Chief
Denmark King
King Denmark
Wallace's Denmark Chief
Cleveland
Hamlet
Washington
Denmark Chief J B
Cromwell Jr
Sterling Denmark
Tarkington's Cromwell Denmark
Franklin's Cromwell Jr
Latham's Denmark
Stonewall Jackson
Beard's Stonewall
Eagle Red
Ernest Stonewall
Foster's Stonewall
Gardner's Stonewall
Red Eagle
Robert E Lee
Rock-a-by
Son of Stonewall Jackson
Ticonderoga
Bob Lee
Stonewall Jackson Jr
On Time
Fancy Boy
Smith's Stonewall
Fayette Denmark
Kentucky Bird
Son of Fayette Denmark
Crabb's Bourbon Denmark
Fancy Denmark
Jewel Denmark
Dolan's Dillard
Dolan's Granger
Second Jewel
Beau Brummel of Kenmore
Jewel
Star Denmark
Denmark Halcorn
Rolla Denmark
Whip Denmark
King Denmark
Old Tuckahoe
Tuckahoe
Diamond Denmark
Black Donald
Bedford Brooks
Brooks
Wallace Bonesetter
Black McDonald
Crabb's Diamond Jr
Crabb's Diamond King
Diamond King
Diamond Chief
Diamond Jr
Diamond Denmark Jr
Dandy Denmark
Hollywood Denmark
Nora Harrison
Tom Diamond
Billy Diamond
Young Diamond
Montrose
Bonny Ladd
Branstetter's Montrose
Coon's Montrose
Diamond Joe
Harry Montrose
J S Marmaduke
Jack
Joe Berry's Monte
Josephus
Son of Montrose
Railey
Mossrose
Montrose Jr
Monte Cristo
Coulter's Montrose Jr
Warner Montrose
Wild Rose
Chestnut Rose
Black Rose II
Prince Rose
Star Rose
Capt Thomas Ruby
Diamond Montrose
Hamilton's Montrose Jr
Hoxie
Lamb's Rosemont
Rosemont-Monsees
Black Rose
Bozyon Montrose
Rosemont
Star Rose-Eubanks
King Lee Rose
Rosewood II
Game
Mont-Rex
Montrose Superior
Ortiz Rose
Mark Diamond
Black Diamond
Dillard Denmark
Mark Denmark
Markham
Master Diamond
Yantis Diamond King
Diamond Denmark Jr
Grover
Mark Denmark Jr
Star Dillard Denmark
Taylor's Mark Diamond Jr
Martell
Prince Diamond
Brown Diamond
Denmark Chief
Mark Denmark Jr
Terry's Black Diamond
King of Diamonds II
Star Black Beauty
Herzogg
Crystal Denmark
Lail's Denmark Chief
Denmark Jr
Crigler's Denmark
Rex Denmark
Cleveland Denmark
Piedmont
Sumpter Denmark
Banta's Sumpter Denmark Jr
Brown Bon-ton
Black Denmark
J I C Denmark
Fant's Denmark
Funk's Sumpter Denmark
Miller Lee
Kentucky Boy
Sumpter Denmark Jr
Wallace Denmark
Young Denmark
Price's Black Denmark
Chrisman's Denmark
Banta's Denmark
Son of Banta's Denmark
Walla
Sumpter Denmark II
Ball Hornet
Bon Ton
Gray Boy
Pacolet Denmark
Pat Denmark
Pilcher Denmark
Sumpter Denmark III
Black Sump
Banta's George
Cooper Horse

References

Individual American Saddlebreds